The Mobile Gendarmerie Music Band is a Military band unit of the Mobile Gendarmerie. It is placed under the authority of the Military governor of Paris. In this capacity, it accompanies ceremonies in the capital for the on the national level. It is a part of the National Gendarmerie and is one of two military bands in the service branch, with the other being the French Republican Guard Band.

It was first created in 1934, when at the time, the armed forces was led by Maxime Weygand and the Parisian military governor was Henri Gouraud. It was converted into an infantry Band in the Republican Guard in 1945, and took its current name in 1974. Since July 2007, the band has been stationed in Maisons-Alfort.

Activities 
Her missions also include concerts, festivals and major cultural events to which she is regularly invited. In addition, she participates in parades and parades for the benefit of the National Gendarmerie.

The concert band and string orchestra specifically perform either separately or as a combined ensemble during state dinners, or government organized concerts.

These activities are supported by the different ensembles of the band:

Fanfare band
Corps of drums
Concert Band
Reed Ensemble
String Ensemble
Saxophone Quartet
Trombones Quintet

See also 
 National Gendarmerie
 Mobile Gendarmerie
 Military governor of Paris
 French Foreign Legion Music Band (MLE)
 French Republican Guard Band
 Military band

References 

French military bands
Military units and formations established in 1934
1934 establishments in France
French Gendarmerie